Dasytes tristiculus is a species of beetles belonging to the family Melyridae.

Distribution
This Mediterranean species is present in France, Italy and Spain.

Description
These small black beetles have long erect black pubescence  over the entire surface of the elytra and pronotum. The females usually show a broad transversal band of lighter pubescence anteriorly.

Phenology
Adults can be found from April to June.

References

External links
 
 
 Galerie Insecte 

Melyridae
Beetles of Europe